Anthony Vidler (born July 4, 1941, in Salisbury Plain, United Kingdom) is Professor at the Irwin S. Chanin School of Architecture at The Cooper Union. He is an architectural historian and critic.

Education 

Anthony Vidler received a B.A. and Dipl.Arch from Cambridge University and a Ph.D. from Technical University Delft.

Teaching 

Vidler has taught at Brown University, The Cooper Union, UCLA, Cornell University, and Princeton University

He has been awarded fellowships with the Institute for Architecture and Urban Studies (1971–84), the New York Institute for the Humanities at New York University (1980–82), the John Simon Guggenheim Memorial Foundation (1985-86), the National Endowment for the Humanities (1989–90), the American Academy of Arts and Sciences (1995-present), and the Canadian Centre for Architecture in Montreal (2005).

Curatorial work 
Vidler has curated several exhibitions since the late 1980s, including the part of the exhibition out of the box: price rossi stirling + matta-clark dedicated to James Stirling at the Canadian Centre for Architecture (2003-2004) and the exhibition Notes from the Archive: James Frazer Stirling which travelled to the Yale Center for British Art, the Tate, the Staatsgalerie Stuttgart, and the Canadian Centre for Architecture (2010-2012).

Publications 

The Writing of the Walls. Architectural Theory in the Late Enlightenment (Princeton: Princeton Architectural Press, 1987). Paperback, 1990.
Ledoux (Paris: Editions Hazan, 1987). Foreign editions: Berlin, 1989, Tokyo, 1989, Madrid, 1994.
Claude-Nicolas Ledoux: Architecture and Social Reform at the End of the Ancien Régime (Cambridge, Mass.: MIT Press, 1990).
The Architectural Uncanny: Essays in the Modern Unhomely (Cambridge, Mass.: MIT Press, 1992).
L'Espace des Lumières: Architecture et philosophie de Ledoux à Fourier (Paris: Editions Picard, 1992). Translation and revised edition of The Writing of the Walls with new introduction and concluding chapter, 1992. Spanish edition: El espacio de la Ilustración. La teoria arquitectónica en Francia a finales del siglo XVIII, trans. Jorge Sainz (Madrid: Alianza Editorial, 1997).
Antoine Grumbach (Paris: Centre Georges Pompidou, 1996).
Warped Space: Art, Architecture, and Anxiety in Modern Culture (Cambridge, Mass.: MIT Press, 2000).
Claude-Nicolas Ledoux (Paris: Hazan, 2005).
Claude-Nicolas Ledoux: Architecture and Utopia in the Age of the French Revolution (Basel: Birkhäuser, 2006).
Histories of the Immediate Present. Inventing Architectural Modernism (Cambridge, Mass.: MIT Press, 2008).
Architecture Between Spectacle and Use, ed. Anthony Vidler, Clark Studies in the Visual Arts (New Haven and London: Yale University Press, 2008), “Introduction,” pp.vii-xiii; “Architecture's Expanded Field,” pp. 143–154.
James Frazer Stirling: Notes from the Archive (New Haven and London: The Yale Center for British Art and Yale University Press; Montreal: Canadian Centre for Architecture, 2010).
The Scenes of the Street and Other Essays (New York: The Monacelli Press, 2011).

References

External links
 Anthony Vidler: How to Invent Utopia: The Fortunes and Misfortunes of Plato's Polis, Canadian Centre for Architecture, 17 May 2005

Alumni of the University of Cambridge
Living people
Delft University of Technology alumni
Brown University faculty
Cooper Union faculty
University of California, Los Angeles faculty
Princeton University faculty
Cornell University faculty
Fellows of the American Academy of Arts and Sciences
1941 births